The 1996 Monte Carlo Open was a tennis tournament played on outdoor clay courts. It was the 90th edition of the Monte Carlo Masters and was part of the Mercedes Super 9 of the 1996 ATP Tour. It took place at the Monte Carlo Country Club in Roquebrune-Cap-Martin in France from 22 April until 28 April 1996. First-seeded Thomas Muster won the singles title, his third at the event after 1992 and 1995. It was also his 4th final after previously losing in 1990.

Finals

Singles

 Thomas Muster defeated  Albert Costa 6–3, 5–7, 4–6, 6–3, 6–2
 It was Muster's 4th singles title of the year and the 39th of his career.

Doubles

 Ellis Ferreira /  Jan Siemerink defeated  Jonas Björkman /  Nicklas Kulti 2–6, 6–3, 6–2
 It was Ferreira's 2nd title of the year and the 3rd of his career. It was Siemerink's 2nd title of the year and the 9th of his career.

References

External links
 
 ATP tournament profile
 ITF tournament edition details

 
Monte Carlo Open
Monte-Carlo Masters
Monte Carlo Open
Monte Carlo Open
Monte